The 2020 Tokyo Marathon was the fourteenth edition of the annual marathon race in Tokyo, and was held on Sunday, 1 March.  A World Athletics Platinum Label Road Race, it was the first World Marathon Majors event held that year.  Last year's winner, Birhanu Legese, successfully defended his title by winning with a time of 2:04:15, while Lonah Chemtai Salpeter set a new course record as well as a new Israeli national record by winning with a time of 2:17:45. The men's wheelchair race was won by Japanese racer Tomoki Suzuki, and the women's wheelchair race was won by Japanese racer Tsubasa Kina.

References 

2020 in Japanese sport
2020 marathons
2020 in Tokyo
Tokyo Marathon
Tokyo Marathon